China Keitetsi (born 1976) is a Ugandan activist who has won international renown as a campaigner for the plight of child soldiers. The memoirs of Keitetsi, a former child soldier herself, have been translated into French, German, Japanese, Chinese, Danish, Italian, Spanish, Dutch and other languages.

Biography
China Keitetsi was born in 1976 in the west of Uganda. Without her mother she spent her first years with her father and his new girlfriend. In 1984, at the age of nine, China ran off with her sister and tried to find her mother but she fell into the hands of the National Resistance Army. China’s early years in Uganda and as a female child soldier showed the sexual assault that girls and women face in times of war and conflict.

Kampala fell on 26 January 1986, and Museveni was proclaimed as president, but Uganda remained haunted by civil war. During this period, China Keitetsi worked as a bodyguard for a high-ranking official before joining the Military Police. Several armed groups fought against the new government.

Life as a female child soldier 
China, like many other children recruited by the NRA to fight in the battle against the Obote government, remained in the ranks of the new government's army, the Ugandan People's Defence Forces (UPDF). She spent ten years as a female child soldier in fear, humiliation, and sexual assault under the Ugandan National Resistance Army. She lost many of her friends in battle and, like many other girls, was raped several times by her superior officers.

Life as free woman 
Between 1986 and 1995 she made some short returns to civilian life but spent most of her time in the new governmental army.

After spending ten years in the army of Museveni, China escaped from the army in 1995. She fled with a friend through Kenya, Tanzania, Zambia and Zimbabwe to South Africa where she applied for refugee status. Four years later, China continued to fear for her safety and sought help from the Department of Home Affairs. She was referred to the UN High Commissioner for Refugees (UNHCR) and was offered relocation in Denmark.

She now lives in Denmark and has published her memoirs in a book entitled Child Soldier: Fighting for my life. She has become an international spokeswoman for the plight of child soldiers worldwide. China goes around Europe, the United States, Canada, and Japan, as well as to the UN, UNESCO, and the German Parliament giving lectures on the problems of children as soldiers. Many organizations, including UNICEF, Amnesty International, Terre des Hommes, Oxfam, the Coalition to Stop the Use of Child Soldiers, and IANSA, support China Keitetsi in her cause. China's book has been published in Denmark, The Netherlands, Germany, Austria, Switzerland, South Africa, England, France, Spain, the Czech Republic, Japan and China.

She recorded an intro to the song "Blood" of The Kelly Family (sung by Jimmy Kelly on the 2003 album Homerun).

Her books 

 Child Soldier: Fighting for my Life (German edition: Sie nahmen mir die Mutter und gaben mir ein Gewehr) published in 2002
 Tears Between Heaven and Earth: My way back to life 2007

References

External links
Interview with China Keitetsi, Harvard Gazette
Amnesty International website
China Keitetsi homepage

1976 births
Living people
Ugandan non-fiction writers
Ugandan women writers